Greatest Hits is a 1970 album by Herb Alpert & the Tijuana Brass. It was the group's first compilation album, with all selections coming from its first five albums. The album was released a few months after Alpert had disbanded the group. It rose to #43 on the U.S. charts, and to #8 in the U.K. The album was eventually certified gold in the spring of 1971. 

Greatest Hits was released during Alpert's four-year sabbatical from performing, when he concentrated instead on producing records for other artists signed to his A&M label.

Track listing

References

1970 greatest hits albums
Herb Alpert albums
A&M Records compilation albums
Albums produced by Herb Alpert
Albums produced by Jerry Moss